is a village in Nagano Prefecture, Japan. , the village had an estimated population of 4,360 in 1742 households, and a population density of 76 persons per km².

Geography
Aoki is located in the center of Nagano Prefecture, in a basin surrounded by mountains on three sides. The village is at an average elevation of between 500 and 850 meters, with approximately 80% of the village area covered in mountains and forests. Around 10% of the village area is agricultural, with rice, mushrooms and horticulture as the main agricultural activities.

Climate
The village has a climate characterized by characterized by hot and humid summers, and cold winters (Köppen climate classification Cfa).  The average annual temperature in Aoki is 10.8 °C. The average annual rainfall is 1103 mm with September as the wettest month. The temperatures are highest on average in August, at around 24.1 °C, and lowest in January, at around -1.8 °C.

Surrounding municipalities
Nagano Prefecture
 Matsumoto
 Ueda
 Chikuhoku

Demographics 
Per Japanese census data, the population of Aoki has been declining over the past 60 years.

History
The area of present-day Aoki was part of ancient Shinano Province. The area was part of the holdings of Ueda Domain during the Edo period. The modern village of Aoki was established on April 1, 1889 by the establishment of the municipalities system. A proposal to merge with the neighboring city of Ueda was rejected by voters in 2002.

Education
Aoki has one public elementary school and one public middle school. The village does not have a high school.

Transportation

Railway
Since the discontinuation of the Ueda Onsen Electric Railway's Aoki Line in 1938, the village has not had passenger railway service.

Highway

Sister City relations
 - Nagaizumi, Shizuoka, Japan
 - Shōbu, Saitama, Japan 
 - Namche Bazaar, Nepal

Local attractions
Daihō-ji, a Buddhist temple with a three-story pagoda that is a National Treasure of Japan
 Tazawa Onsen

Notable people from Aoki
Keita Gotō - industrialist

References

External links

Official Website 

 
Villages in Nagano Prefecture